Olya-e Khaledabad (also Romanized as ‘Olyā-e Khāledābād; also known as ‘Olyā) is a village in Rudbal Rural District, in the Central District of Marvdasht County, Fars Province, Iran. At the 2006 census, its population was 812, in 202 families.

References 

Populated places in Marvdasht County